The 1908 United States presidential election in Wisconsin was held on November 3, 1908 as part of the 1908 United States presidential election. State voters chose 13 electors to the Electoral College, who voted for president and vice president.

Background and vote
Ever since the decline of the Populist movement, Wisconsin had become almost a one-party state dominated by the Republican Party. The Democratic Party became entirely uncompetitive outside certain German Catholic counties adjoining Lake Michigan as the upper classes, along with the majority of workers who followed them, completely fled from William Jennings Bryan’s agrarian and free silver sympathies. As Democratic strength weakened severely after 1894 – although the state did develop a strong Socialist Party to provide opposition to the GOP – Wisconsin developed the direct Republican primary in 1903 and this ultimately created competition between the “League” under Robert M. La Follette, and the conservative “Regular” faction.

When William Jennings Bryan was nominated for a third presidential bid, he visited Wisconsin in early August to urge the Democrats in the state legislature to support his state policies. An earlier poll had suggest Bryan gaining a substantial part of the radical La Follette following, and Bryan would ridicule new Republican nominee William Howard Taft in Milwaukee during the last week of September.

Despite Bryan’s campaigns, October polls by the Chicago Record-Herald said that Wisconsin was certain to vote for Taft, As things turned out, the Record-Herald polls were accurate, with Taft winning by eighty-one thousand votes, and carrying all but six counties.

Results

Results by county

See also
 United States presidential elections in Wisconsin

References

Wisconsin
1908 Wisconsin elections
1908